Eslamabad-e Lakazi (also Romanized as Eslāmābād-e Laḵazī; also known as Eslāmābād and Shāhābād) is a village in Fazl Rural District, in the Central District of Nishapur County, Razavi Khorasan Province, Iran. At the 2006 census, its population was 453, in 140 families.

References 

Populated places in Nishapur County